Eduardo Márquez may refer to:

 Eduardo Márquez Talledo (1902–1975), Peruvian composer
 Eduardo Márquez (footballer) (1944–2020), Peruvian football forward

See also
 Eduardo Marques (born 1976), Brazilian football striker